The Team Event competition at the 2017 World Championships was held on 14 February 2017.

FIS Overall Nations Cup standings
The participating nations were seeded according to the Overall Nations Cup standings prior to the World Championships:

Results
The event was started at 12:00.

Bracket

References

Nations team event